auch ("also") is the twelfth full-length studio album by German rock band Die Ärzte. It was released on 13 April 2012. For each song on the album, an animation and a performance video was released on YouTube. The B-sides of the singles also received a video (altogether 37 videos). The videos can also be bought in iTunes. The first single "zeiDverschwÄndung" was released on 2 March 2012.

While a commercial success - the album reached the first position in Germany, Austria and Switzerland in the first week after its release - critical reception of auch was generally mixed. Promoting and touring in support of the album led to personal tensions within the band that resulted in the Die Ärzte's second hiatus (which unlike their first one was unintended) that ended with the writing and recording of Hell, released in 2020.

Layout 
The layout was made by Felix Schlüter instead of the designer Schwarwel who designed for Die Ärzte since 1993.

The package is a carton box like the package of the album Jazz ist anders. Inside the box is a party game: The CD is a turntable, three crown corks are the figures and the booklet is the game field.

Track listing

Charts

Weekly charts

Year-end charts

Certifications

References 

2012 albums
Die Ärzte albums
German-language albums